The mobile phone industry in Russia has expanded rapidly to become one of the largest in the world. In terms of number of smartphone users, Russia is the 4th biggest smartphone market in the world sitting behind only China, India, and USA.

History
In 1963, USSR's first mobile phone network using the car phone came into operation.

Initial selection of technological mobile standard in Russia had been left for market forces by issuing licenses for different standards. Later, regulatory authorities have developed stricter policy. However, there still exists a great variety of both analogue and digital standards. NMT standard was a first generation analogue mobile technology that still has footstep in Russia, employed by commercial mobile operators since the early 90s.

Regional operators have deployed the GSM networks in Russia since 1995, originally in the 900 MHz frequency band. GSM standard is dominating in Russian mobile market with small number of NMT-450, AMPS/DAMPS subscribers.

In 1994, a joint venture of Moscow City Telephone Network, T-Mobile and Siemens, which later became part of Mobile TeleSystems, offered Russia's first mobile phone service for the public in Moscow. In the same year in June, VimpelCom also started Beeline mobile phone service.

In 2002, MegaFon was formed to provide all-Russia service, amalgamating Sonic Duo of Moscow, Mobikom-Novosibirsk, and other companies. In that year also, the number of mobile subscribers in Russia soared by 130% to 18mn, implying penetration of 12.3%, compared with 5.4% at the end of the previous year. The continued strong growth of the cellular subscriber base was largely due to the accelerating regional rollout of the major national cellular operators. In 2007, MegaFon started Russia's first 3G service in Saint Petersburg.

Russian WiMAX operator Scartel (Yota brand), finished in 2010 its implementation of a trial LTE network in Kazan and plans to deploy LTE networks in Novosibirsk and Samara. In July 2010 Scartel received approval from regulator Roskomnadzor to abandon WiMAX for LTE, re-using its existing spectrum. the regulator had however previously insisted that the frequencies allocated to Scartel for WiMAX could not be used for other access types.

On the Amur Highway at the beginning of October 2011 MTS, Vimpelcom and Megaphone completed the construction of a joint network to provide mobile communication. Operators built across the highway 102 towers (of 140 towers) for base stations, 32 of which have launched MTS and "MegaFon" and 38 by VimpelCom, now Veon Ltd (due to the fact that it has only in the Far East 3G licenses, and in some regions of the Federation, GSM-1800).

The 2012 tender of the Ministry of Communications awarded licenses to deploy LTE networks in the lower (720–790 MHz, 791–862 MHz) and upper (2500–2690 MHz) bands to the "big 3" (Megafon, MTS and Veon) and to the national fixed-line operator Rostelecom. Each of the winners relies on two lanes wide in the upper range of 10 MHz and 7.5 MHz in the lower. The upper range of frequencies considered to be free and is suitable for deploying LTE. However, the lower, mostly occupied by the security forces and navigation and radar systems.

On September of that year MTS launched the country's first TD-LTE network, using the TD-LTE spectrum in the 2595–2620 MHz band it secured in February. Nokia Siemens had provided its Single Radio Access Network using energy-efficient Flexi Multiradio Base Stations as well as its Liquid Core-based Evolved Packet Core platform.

In November 2013 Megafon began to provide the LTE network in the Republic of Kalmykia, the Yamal-Nenets Autonomous Okrug, and the Altai Krai. The network was launched in major cities in the regions Elista, Noyabrsk, Novy Urengoy and Gorno-Altaisk. On the same month Mobile phone retailer Svyaznoi started selling SIM cards under the Svyaznoi Mobile brand in November, becoming a new mobile virtual network operator (MVNO), using MTS infrastructure. Interregional TransitTelekom said a month later that it also plans to launch an MVNO in April 2014 targeting migrant workers, offering low cost calls to Central Asian countries.

In December 2013, Minister of Communications, Nikolay Nikiforov recalled that in 2011 270 base stations of LTE were launched, in 2012 about 4,000, in 2013 10,000 and it is planned that in 2014–2015 more than 15 thousand such stations. On the same month it was announced that the "biggest four", Rostelecom, MTS, Beeline and Megafon completed the construction of communication facilities in the areas of transport corridor "North South" and "East West", with a total length of more than 11 thousand km. Work was done to ensure that these routes support advanced cellular communication, and operators spent money under the federal program to improve road safety and implementation of the "Glonass Era". Objects were built on federal roads M5 Ural, M6 Caspian, M53, M55 Baikal and M60 Ussuri according to the press service of the Ministry of Communications of Russia. Costs for the construction of antenna towers were divided by the operators on an equal share, and the cost to provide power to the communication infrastructure undertaken by the state. At the end of this month Scartel (Yota brand) launched LTE network in the cities of Cheboksary, Irkutsk, Kirov, Omsk, Penza, and Ulyanovsk.

Mobile phone service providers

There are four nationwide mobile phone service providers who possess 2G and 3G licenses in every region of Russia (so called Big-4):

MTS 

Mobile TeleSystems (MTS, in ), 51% owned by AFK Sistema, provides mobile phone service, using 2G GSM technology, 3G service, using W-CDMA technology. It also provides fixed broadband services and fixed-line telephony services (in Moscow via its 99% subsidiary MGTS).

As of June 2012, MTS was the biggest mobile operator in Russia in terms of subscriber base with 69.6 mln subscribers (31% market share). It also had 35,7 mln subscribers in several CIS-countries, including Ukraine, Uzbekistan, Armenia and Belarus.
As of January 2012, MTS had 2.1 mln residential fixed broadband subscribers (11% market share) being the biggest player on the Moscow market (940,000 subscribers, or 27% market share).

Beeline 

Veon Ltd (fully incorporated in Bermuda) provides mobile services under Beeline brand, using 2G GSM and 3G (W-CDMA) technologies. In April 2011, Veon closed the combination with Wind Telecom and turned into a global carrier operating in roughly 20 countries, including Russia, Ukraine, Italy (Wind), Algeria (Djezzy), CIS countries and other.

As of June 2012 it had 55.7 mln subscribers in Russia (24% market share in terms of subscribers) and over 209 mln subscribers worldwide.

MegaFon 

MegaFon (in ) is owned by Russian oligarch Alisher Usmanov. The company provides 2G (GSM) and 3G (W-CDMA) mobile phone services. In April 2012, MegaFon was the first of Big-3 operators to launch 4G services. It is the only Big-3 company which remains private, yet rumours about company's possible IPO were circulating for several years. In June 2012 (after significant changes in shareholders structure) MegaFon confirmed that it is looking for going public in second half of the year in case market conditions will become «favourable»

As of June 2012, MegaFon had 55.7 mln subscribers in Russia (27% market share). Unlike MTS and Veon, Megafon has neither developed operations outside Russia (it has only 1.6 mln subscribers in Tajikistan, Ossetia and Abkhazia) nor has focused on residential broadband services (its market share is below 4%, with most of subscribers in Moscow).

Tele2 (Rostelecom)
Rostelecom the largest fixed-line operator and former monopoly, together with its subsidiary T2-Mobile provide mobile services on the territory of 65 regions of Russia, serving more than 36.5 million subscribers. During the 2010s, Rostelecom and Tele2 built mobile networks of the third generation in 40 regions of Russia. Total planned to install more than 8 thousand base stations. Suppliers of equipment and solutions for the 3G+ network are Ericsson and Huawei. Delta Telecom (in Russian: Дельта Телеком) offers Sky Link (in Russian: Скай Линк) service in northwest Russia and other areas, using 2G, 3G and LTE-450 technology.

Mobile phone industry
The mobile phone service provider licensing in Russia is under the control of Rospechat, the Federal Agency on Press and Mass Communications of Russia.

For new technologies, Russia's mobile phone industry has depended on overseas companies. For example, in 2009, MegaFon revealed that Nokia Siemens Networks (NSN) was selected as the winner of its tender to building 3G network and that the following companies together would collaborate on MegaFon's 3G deployment and upgrades until 2010:
 Nokia Siemens Networks (NSN)
 Huawei Technologies
 Alcatel-Lucent
 Ericsson
 ZTE

The Russian mobile phone service operators have been active in their presence in the CIS and other foreign countries. Beeline is already in Kazakhstan, Ukraine and Armenia. MegaFon is in Georgia, Tajikistan, Uzbekistan and Iran. Mobile TeleSystems is in Armenia, Ukraine, Belarus, Uzbekistan, Turkmenistan, Pakistan and India (using CDMA).

On December 4, 2013, the first Russian smartphone, Yotaphone was launched. The idea of YotaPhone was created in Russia, but manufacturing and assembly of the phone is done in China. YotaPhone is a smartphone with support for fourth generation networks, LTE. Feature of the device is the presence of a 4.3-inch screens on two sides: The LCD one is on the front, while the black and white screen with "electronic ink" is on the back side. The first device was awarded to Prime Minister of Russia Dmitry Medvedev by Rostec state corporation head, Sergei Chemezov.

Russian manufacturers
Beeline
Explay (become subsidiary of Fly in 2015)
Gresso
Highscreen
Megafon
MTS
RoverPC
teXet
Sitronics
Yotaphone

Number portability
Number portability officially became available in Russia on December 1, 2013. An appropriate legislation signed into law by President Vladimir Putin a year earlier, on December 26, 2012. Operators have repeatedly stated that the time allotted is not enough to run services. Within 12 days since the law came into force, 9090 subscribers filed applications to move to another operator, of which only 57 until satisfied.

See also
 Telecommunications in Russia
 Federal Agency on Press and Mass Communications of Russia
 List of mobile network operators of Europe#Russia
 
 
 Mobile phone industry in Ukraine

References

External links
 MegaFon official site
 Mobile TeleSystems official site
 VimpelCom official site
 Delta Telecom & Sky Link official site (in Russian)

Telecommunications in Russia
Russia